Deh Sorkh (also known as Deh Sorkh-e Pā’īn and Deh Sorkh-e Soflá) is a village in Tabadkan Rural District, in the Central District of Mashhad County, Razavi Khorasan Province, Iran. At the 2006 census, its population was 415, in 105 families.

References 

Populated places in Mashhad County